Ficus adhatodifolia is a species of plant of the Moraceae family, found in South America.

References 

adhatodifolia
Flora of South America